is a national university in Kanoya, Kagoshima, Japan, founded in 1981.

Four alumni  participated in the swimming and volleyball events in the Beijing Olympics, including Athens Olympics swimming gold medalist Ai Shibata.

Four players participated by swimming and a bicycle also the London Olympic Games.

Alumnus
Ai Shibata
Noriyuki Sugasawa

References

External links
 

Educational institutions established in 1981
Japanese national universities
National Institute of Fitness and Sports in Kanoya
1981 establishments in Japan
Sports universities and colleges